Alberto Monreal Luque (18 November 1926 – 4 August 2014) was a Spanish politician who served as minister of Finance of Spain between 1969 and 1973, during the Francoist dictatorship.

References

1926 births
2014 deaths
Economy and finance ministers of Spain
Government ministers during the Francoist dictatorship